Ligularia fischeri, known as gomchwi, Fischer's ragwort, or Fischer's leopard plant, is a species in the genus Ligularia (family Asteraceae). It is native to east Asia.

Description
Later after it has bloomed, it produces a seed capsule, with seeds with downy hairs which are tinged brown or purple.

Culinary use

Korea

In Korean cuisine, the leaves of gomchwi along with other chwinamul varieties are often used as the main ingredient of herbal side dishes called namul. Gomchwi can be eaten pickled as jangajji or kimchi, and eaten fresh as a ssam (wrap) vegetable.

References

External links

Korean vegetables
Namul
fischeri
Taxa named by Nikolai Turczaninow